Forts in Artsakh
 
 Aghjkaberd
 Akanaberd
 Berdkunk (Artsakh) - located in the north-western corner of Artsakh
 Darbasner
 Dizapayt Fortress
 Gaylatun Fortress
 Ghlen khut
 Gorozaberd
 Gyulatagh Fortress
 Gyulistan Fortress
 Hakarakaberd
 Handaberd
 Jraberd
 Kachaghakaberd
 Khokhanaberd
 Khtsaberd
 Krvaberd
 Levonaberd
 Mayraberd-Askeran Fortress
 Qtich Fortress
 Shikaqar Fortress
 Shushi
 Tovmasaberd
 Tsor Fortress

See also
 List of forts
 List of castles in Armenia
 List of castles in Azerbaijan

References 

Artsakh
Nagorno-Karabakh Republic
Nagorno-Karabakh Republic
Forts
Forts